Leire Olaberria Dorronsoro; born 17 February 1977) is a Spanish racing cyclist from the Basque Country. She won the Bronze medal in the Women's points race at the 2008 Summer Olympics, finishing behind Marianne Vos (Netherlands) and Yoanka González (Cuba).

Major results

Track

2006
 2nd  Points race, 2005–06 UCI Track Cycling World Cup Classics, Sydney
2007
 3rd  Points race, 2006–07 UCI Track Cycling World Cup Classics, Los Angeles
2008
 2nd  Points race, 2008–09 UCI Track Cycling World Cup Classics, Melbourne
 3rd  Points race, Summer Olympics
2010
 1st  Omnium, 2010–11 UCI Track Cycling World Cup Classics, Melbourne
 1st  Omnium, UEC European Track Championships
 3rd  Omnium, UCI Track Cycling World Championships
2013
 International Belgian Open
1st Omnium
1st Scratch
 Revolution Series, Round 1
2nd Scratch
3rd Points race
 3rd  Omnium, 2012–13 UCI Track Cycling World Cup, Aguascalientes
 3rd  Points race, UEC European Track Championships
2014
 Prova Internacional de Anadia
1st Omnium
2nd Scratch
 2nd Omnium, Revolution – Round 5, London
 2nd Scratch, Fenioux Trophy Piste
 3rd Omnium, Fenioux Piste International
2015
 2nd  Omnium, 2014–15 UCI Track Cycling World Cup, Cali
 Revolution
2nd Scratch – Round 3, Manchester
3rd Points race – Round 5, London
3rd Points race – Round 6, Manchester
3rd Scratch – Round 1, Derby
 2nd Scratch, Grand Prix of Poland
 Irish International Track GP
3rd Individual pursuit
3rd Omnium
2017
 3rd Points race, Trofeo Ciutat de Barcelona–Memorial Miquel Poblet

Road
Source: 

2009
 3rd Time trial, National Road Championships
2010
 National Road Championships
1st  Road race
1st  Time trial
2011
 9th Overall Tour de Bretagne Féminin
2013
 2nd Time trial, National Road Championships
2014
 1st  Time trial, National Road Championships
2015
 3rd Time trial, National Road Championships

See also
 Spain at the 2008 Summer Olympics

References

External links

1977 births
Living people
Cyclists from the Basque Country (autonomous community)
Spanish female cyclists
Cyclists at the 2008 Summer Olympics
Cyclists at the 2012 Summer Olympics
Olympic cyclists of Spain
Olympic bronze medalists for Spain
Spanish track cyclists
Olympic medalists in cycling
People from Tolosaldea
Medalists at the 2008 Summer Olympics
Sportspeople from Gipuzkoa
21st-century Spanish women